Nanping railway station is a railway station located in Fenglin, Hualien, Taiwan. It is located on the Taitung line and is operated by the Taiwan Railways Administration.

References

1915 establishments in Taiwan
Railway stations in Hualien County
Railway stations opened in 1915
Railway stations served by Taiwan Railways Administration